The Sons of Norway Hall, also known as Fedrelandet Lodge #23, is a historic fraternal society building on Indian St. in Petersburg, Alaska. Built in 1912 by volunteers, it was the first Sons of Norway lodge building built in Alaska. The hall was built large enough to stage events involving the entire community of Petersburg, and it was used for many years for all types of civic, social, public, and private events. During World War II it was used as an armory, and it served as a National Guard headquarters in the 1960s.

The building was listed on the National Register of Historic Places (NRHP) in 1979.

See also
National Register of Historic Places listings in Petersburg Census Area, Alaska

References

Buildings and structures completed in 1912
Clubhouses on the National Register of Historic Places in Alaska
European American culture in Alaska
Sons of Norway buildings
Buildings and structures in Petersburg Borough, Alaska
1912 establishments in Alaska
Buildings and structures on the National Register of Historic Places in Petersburg Borough, Alaska